Michał Krzysztof Łapaj (born 3 March 1982 in Warsaw) is a Polish keyboardist best known as a member of the progressive rock-metal band Riverside, with whom he released six albums. Łapaj was also a guest on several albums, including Lunatic Soul Lunatic Soul (2008), Antigama's Meteor (2013) and Behemoth's The Satanist (2013), providing keyboards and Hammond organs.

Equipment 
 Moog Minimoog Model-D
 Sequential Circuits Prophet-5
 Korg Kronos 88
 Korg CX3 Vintage
 Korg Polysix
 Korg MS-20
 Kurzweil K2600X
 Kurzweil K2000VP
 Hammond C3
 Moog Etherwave Theremin
 Leslie Speaker Model 147

Discography 
 Riverside 
 Second Life Syndrome (2005, InsideOut, Mystic Production) 
 Rapid Eye Movement (2007, InsideOut, Mystic Production)
 Anno Domini High Definition (2009, InsideOut, Mystic Production) 
 Shrine of New Generation Slaves (2013, InsideOut, Mystic Production)
 Love, Fear and the Time Machine (2015, InsideOut, Mystic Production)
 Eye of the Soundscape (2016, InsideOut)
 Wasteland (2018, InsideOut)
 ID.Entity (2023, InsideOut)

Solo album
 Are You There (2021, Mystic Production)

Guest appearances
Lunatic Soul – Lunatic Soul (2008, Kscope Music, Mystic Production) 
Leash Eye – V.E.N.I (2009, Metal Mundus) 
Antigama – Meteor (2013, SelfMadeGod Records) 
Behemoth – The Satanist (2014, Metal Blade, Nuclear Blast)

References 

1982 births
Living people
Polish heavy metal musicians
Polish rock musicians
Heavy metal keyboardists
Rock keyboardists
Polish keyboardists
21st-century Polish musicians